Diana Gittins (born 20 October 1946), is a former associate lecturer in creative writing for the Open University and a published writer of fiction and non-fiction books.

Gittins is the author of Madness in Its Place: Narratives of Severalls Hospital 1913-1997, which was adapted for broadcast for BBC Radio 4.

Biography 
Diana Gittins spent her childhood in New England, USA and moved to Devon in the UK when she was 14.

After attending Dartington Hall School, Devon she studied at the University of Paris for a year, University of Essex, and later at Bath Spa University. She has two masters, one in social history and one in writing for young people. She also has a PhD in sociology.

Gittins has had a number of jobs through the years, but her academic roles have included: being a research fellow at the University of Essex; a lecturer at Plymouth University; a lecturer at Colgate University, US; as well as a part-time associate lecturer of creative writing for the Open University.

She lives with her partner in Exeter.

Awards 
 Hawthornden Castle Fellowship
 Shortlisted for the 2009 Cinnamon Poetry Pamphlet competition
 Guernsey International Poetry on the Buses competition, 2011
 Flamingo Feather Poetry Competition (second place)

Publications

Books

Poetry 
 
 
 
  "I Should Have Moved On" by Diana Gittins

Prose 
 
  Pdf of magazine contents.

Non-fiction

See also 
 Severalls Hospital
 Creative writing

References

External links 
 Personal website

1946 births
Academics of the Open University
Academics of the University of Plymouth
Alumni of Bath Spa University
Alumni of the University of Essex
Colgate University faculty
Living people
University of Paris alumni
American non-fiction writers
American women academics
People educated at Dartington Hall School
American women non-fiction writers
American emigrants to the United Kingdom
British expatriates in France